The Saskatchewan River Sturgeon Management Board (SRSMB) advises the governments of Canada, Manitoba, Saskatchewan and First Nations on all matters related to sturgeon management on the Saskatchewan River between the Grand Rapids and E.B. Campbell dams.

Scope

SRSMB members represent provincial and federal agencies, commercial fishermen and local Cree Nations with a common objective:

To prevent further decline of the sturgeon population; and to develop and coordinate a recovery plan.

The Board may make recommendations on the following matters:
Provincial harvest levels (sport, commercial, and domestic)
Aboriginal domestic harvest
Population monitoring
Habitat assessment and enhancement
Fish culture activities
Community education
Water Management with respect to sturgeon requirements
Research

Lake sturgeon overview

Lake sturgeon have always been an important resource for people living along the lower Saskatchewan River. Sturgeon not only provide a traditional food source, but also supported a commercial fishery for over 110 years.

Over-harvesting and habitat changes (resulting from municipal and industrial water use, irrigation and hydroelectric development) have caused a drastic reduction in the sturgeon population in the lower Saskatchewan River during the latter half of the 20th century.

The SRSMB was formed to prevent further population decline and work towards recovery

Habitat impact

Natural Changes

Occasionally waterways change their course and the new channel may or may not be as suitable for sturgeon as the previous channel.

Human Developments

In the past little consideration was given to the effects of developments on fish and their habitat. This is changing and efforts are being made to minimize impacts of new and existing development.
Municipal and Industrial Water Use
 
Municipal and industrial water use can impact sturgeon by changing the amount of water available, the water temperature and water quality.

Irrigation and Agriculture
  
Withdrawing irrigation water from creeks and rivers can reduce and degrade fish habitat.  Agricultural practices can also degrade riverbanks and cause erosion. Erosion increases the amount of sediment in the water and can affect fish survival.

Hydroelectric Development and other Dams

Dams create barriers to upstream movement, can change flow patterns and can damage and destroy habitat, making it less suitable for sturgeon

Sturgeon recovery

The number of sturgeon in the SRSMB area is much lower now than historically. This has been due primarily to a combination of habitat loss and historical over-harvest. The population is no longer large enough to support a commercial fishery and, if it declines further, may soon fail to support the traditional uses of local Aboriginal people.

A recovery program can stop the population decline by:
Decreasing mortality (the number of fish that die) by voluntarily reducing harvest.
Increasing recruitment (the number of new fish each year) by stocking and by allowing the number of spawners to increase through voluntarily reducing harvest.
Protecting and enhancing habitat, such as the quantity and quality of water.

The SRSMB is undertaking a recovery program consisting of several components including:
population monitoring
population enhancement
habitat assessment
habitat use studies
public education.

Members 

The Saskatchewan River Sturgeon Management Board is made up of members representing the following organizations:
Cumberland House Cree Nation
Cumberland House Fishermen's Co-op
Fisheries and Oceans Canada
Manitoba Water Stewardship, Fisheries Branch
Manitoba Hydro
Opaskwayak Cree Nation
Opaskwayak Commercial Fishermen's Co-op
Saskatchewan Northern Affairs
SaskPower
Saskatchewan Watershed Authority
Saskatchewan Environment

See also

Sturgeon
Lake Sturgeon

References

External links
Saskatchewan River Sturgeon Management Board
Department of Fisheries and Oceans
National Factsheet-Lake Sturgeon
Fisheries and Oceans Canada Underworld-The Lake Sturgeon
Nelson River Sturgeon Management Board
Manitoba Conservation
Environment Canada: Species at Risk
COSEWIC (Committee on the Status of Endangered Wildlife in Canada)
Manitoba Hydro
Cumberland House Cree Nation
Village of Cumberland House
SaskPower
Saskatchewan Environment
Environmental organizations based in Saskatchewan
Saskatchewan River